The Socialist Youth Austria (SJÖ) is a socialist youth organisation in Austria. While not part of the Social Democratic Party of Austria (SPÖ), there is a close relationship between the two organisations.

The basic program of the organisation adopted in 2004 is based on scientific socialism and Marxism, which positions it to the left of its social democratic mother party.

The SJÖ is member of the Young European Socialists and the International Union of Socialist Youth.

References

External links
Official homepage of Sozialistische Jugend Österreich 

Social Democratic Party of Austria
Youth wings of political parties in Austria
Youth wings of social democratic parties
1946 establishments in Austria